Dzelukope is a town located near Keta in the Volta Region of Ghana.

Victoria Agbotui, mother of Jerry John Rawlings, was born in Dzelukope in 1919.

Education 
Some notable educational institutions located at Dzelukope:
 Keta Senior High Technical School
 Dzelukope R.C. Basic Schools
DzeluKope( Evangelical Presbyterian Church ) E.P basic schools

References 

Populated places in the Volta Region